The 1986 African Cup of Champions Clubs Final was a football tie held over two legs in December 1986 between Zamalek, and Africa Sports.

Zamalek from Egypt won that final 4 – 2 in the penalty shoot-out, with the aggregate ending 2 – 2.

Match details

First leg

Second leg

Notes and references
 http://www.angelfire.com/ak/EgyptianSports/ZamalekAfr1986.html
 https://web.archive.org/web/20160305043429/http://www.rsssf.com/tablesa/afcup86.html

African Cup of Champions Clubs Finals
1
CCL
CCL
CAF Champions League Final 1986